Barbados competed at the 1976 Summer Olympics in Montreal, Quebec, Canada. Eleven competitors, nine men and two women, took part in eleven events in two sports.

Athletics

Men's 800 metres
 Orlando Greene
 Heat — 1:51.43 (→ did not advance)

Men's 4x100 metres Relay
Rawle Clarke, Hamil Grimes, Pearson Jordan, and Pearson Trotman
 Heat — 41.15s (→ did not advance)

Men's 4x400 metres Relay 
 Victor Gooding, Harcourt Wason, Hamil Grimes, and Orlando Greene
 Heat — 3:08.13 (→ did not advance)
Lorna Forde
Freida Nicholls-Davy

Cycling

Two cyclists represented Antigua and Barbuda in 1976.

Sprint
 Stanley Smith — 18th place

1000m time trial
 Hector Edwards — 1:10.084 (→ 18th place)

References

External links
Official Olympic Reports

Nations at the 1976 Summer Olympics
1976
Olympics